A Ramp or Inclined plane is a simple machine.

Ramp may also refer to:

Businesses and organisations
 Ramp, an American financial service and technology company based in New York, NY.

Science
 Ramp function, in mathematics the integral of the unit step function
 Receptor activity-modifying protein (RAMP), a class of protein
 (R)-1-amino-2-methoxymethylpyrrolidine, a chiral auxiliary used in the Enders SAMP/RAMP hydrazone-alkylation reaction

Transportation
 Airport ramp, the area where aircraft are loaded and unloaded
 Linkspan, on a ferry or a ferry slip
 Interchange (road) entrance ramp/on ramp or exit ramp/off ramp, on a freeway
 Speed bumps, also called ramps
 Wheelchair ramp, an alternative to stairs
 Parking ramp, a multi-story structure for car parking with ramps between floors

Sports
 Vert ramp and mini ramp, half-pipe structures used in gravity extreme sports
 Mark Ramprakash (born 1969), English cricketer nicknamed "Ramps"

Music
 RAMP, a soul/jazz group from Cincinnati
Ramp, a 1991 album by Giant Sand
 "Ramp! (The Logical Song)", German band Scooter's cover of the Supertramp song

Places
 Ramp, West Virginia, an unincorporated community
 Ramp Run, a stream in Ohio

Other uses
 Allium tricoccum, ramp or ramps, common name for a wild onion or garlic, native to eastern North America
 Car ramp, a simple method of raising a vehicle from the ground
 Operation Ramp, an Australian Defence Force evacuation of civilians during the 2006 Lebanon War
 Ramp or catwalk, used by models in a fashion show; see Runway (fashion)
 RAMP Simulation Software for Modelling Reliability, Availability and Maintainability
 Responsible Alcohol Management Program, a voluntary certification managed by the Pennsylvania Liquor Control Board (www.LCB.pa.gov/Education/RAMP/Pages/default.aspx)
 Russian Anonymous Marketplace, a Russian dark web market that shut down in 2017

See also
 The Ramp (disambiguation)